UPE can refer to:

 Union Pearson Express
 Universal Primary Education
 Universidade de Pernambuco
 University of Paris-Est (Université Paris-Est), France
 University of Port Elizabeth
 The Unix Programming Environment
 Unsaturated polyester
 Upe, traditional Bougainvillean headdress, in Papua New Guinea
 Upe, the Polynesian term for the Marquesan imperial pigeon
 Upsilon Pi Epsilon, an honor society for computing and information, established in 1967 in Texas
 Upe, the symbol for the chemical element Unpentennium
 Union for Europe, the French acronym (used in official EU documents) for the European Parliamentary Group
UPE (Mexibús), a BRT station in Ecatepec de Morelos, Mexico